Linda Pitmon is an American drummer known for her work with the supergroups The Baseball Project and the Filthy Friends.

Pitmon played percussion in band and orchestra in high school.  She suffered from rheumatoid arthritis and drumming was a helpful way to manage her symptoms. The first band she played with was Zuzu's Petals. She plays with a minimal setup which she likes so that she can be flexible and "play around the beat." She cites Jody Stephens from Big Star, Stan Lynch, Jim Keltner and Dave Mattacks as her influences.

During the COVID era, she and her husband Steve Wynn performed thirty shows online from their home, via Facebook, using an iPad on a tripod. For 2021 they are performing on the "Impossible Tour," which will be 13 hour-long shows where their studio space, the Chimp Factory, is redecorated to look like virtual versions of some of their favorite clubs worldwide.

Gear
Pitmon plays has a few vintage drum kits: a 1961 red sparkle Slingerland, a 1976 bicentennial-stripe Ludwig, a '70s-era blue Ludwig Vistalites, and a '60s-era Slingerland set. Her extra Ludwig snares include a '70s-era Acrolite and a 1964 Supraphonic. She uses 20" or 24" vintage Paiste 602 cymbals as well as an 18" Zildjian Kerope, an 18" A. Zildjian & CIE "Vintage" reissue, 15" Paiste Giant Beat hi-hats, and a 16" model from the Cymbal & Gong company. She also uses lightweight single-braced stands, a DW 9000 bass drum pedal, Vic Firth 8D wooden-tip sticks, and Remo heads.

Personal life
Pitmon was raised in Minneapolis, Minnesota and began playing on "Tupperware and Tinker Toys" as a three year old. She had early jobs as a record store employee and as a DJ. She is married to musician Steve Wynn, and they live in Queens.

References

Year of birth missing (living people)
Place of birth missing (living people)
The Baseball Project members
Living people
American rock drummers
21st-century American musicians
American women drummers
21st-century American women
Filthy Friends members